Ryusenji Dam  is a gravity dam located in Hiroshima Prefecture in Japan. The dam is used for irrigation and water supply. The catchment area of the dam is 5.6 km2. The dam impounds about 8  ha of land when full and can store 1016 thousand cubic meters of water. The construction of the dam was started on 1956 and completed in 1965.

References

Dams in Hiroshima Prefecture